Taz Alexander is a British singer who has toured with Juno Reactor, Alpha-X, and Sin e, among others. She currently resides in London, England.

Career
With Juno Reactor, she has provided her voice for the soundtracks for The Matrix Reloaded, The Matrix Revolutions, Animatrix, and Once Upon A Time In Mexico, as well as singing on Shango, Labyrinth and Gods & Monsters.

In her recording with Alpha-X, she has worked with the band's leader, Declan Flynn, whose music has appeared on the Buddha Bar albums and, most recently on the album A Plea for Sanity. Her work with the world fusion band Sin e, of which she is a founding member and with which she has toured with extensively, has helped the band succeed with its three albums.

She has performed with such musicians as Christy Moore, Taj Mahal, John Otway and Van Morrison. In 2001, she was briefly vocalist with Steeleye Span. In 2009, the obscure band Sunkings released a new album Before We Die on Chill Tribe Records, with several tracks featuring Taz Alexander.

References

External links
 Official homepage

British women singers
Singers from London
Year of birth missing (living people)
Living people
Juno Reactor members